Hoeven is a hamlet in the southern Netherlands. It is located in the Dutch province of North Brabant, in the municipality of Gemert-Bakel, about 1 km southeast of Milheeze and about 4 km north of Deurne.

Hoeven is not a statistical entity, and the postal authorities have placed it under Milheeze. It has no place name signs and consists of about 30 houses.

It was first mentioned between 1838 and 1857 as Hoeven, and means "piece of land".

References

Populated places in North Brabant
Gemert-Bakel